Sensation is a 1936 British crime film directed by Brian Desmond Hurst and starring John Lodge, Diana Churchill, Francis Lister and Felix Aylmer. The screenplay concerns a crime reporter who solves a murder case using a piece of evidence he found amongst the victim's possessions.

Cast
 John Lodge as Pat Heston
 Diana Churchill as Masie Turnpit
 Francis Lister as Richard Grainger
 Joan Marion as Mrs Grainger
 Margaret Vyner as Claire Lindsay
 Jerry Verno as Spikey
 Richard Bird as Henry Belcher
 Athene Seyler as Madame Henry
 Dennis Wyndham as Spurge
 Henry Oscar as Superintendent Stainer
 Anthony Holles as Clarke
 Martin Walker as Dimmitt
 Sybil Grove as Mrs Spurge
 Leslie Perrins as Strange
 Felix Aylmer as Lord Bouverie

Reception
Writing for The Spectator in 1937, Graham Greene gave the film a poor review, faulting the "bad casting, bad story construction, [and] uncertain editing". While praising the acting of Holles, Seyler, and Marion, Greene found that the rest of the cast handicapped the director, and that the story lost its authenticity "in false trails, in an absurd love-story, in humour based on American film, and in the complete unreality of the 'murder gang'."

References

External links
 www.briandesmondhurst.org- Official legacy website of the director with filmography including Sensation
 

1936 films
1936 crime films
British crime films
Films shot at British International Pictures Studios
Films directed by Brian Desmond Hurst
Films set in London
Films about journalists
British black-and-white films
1930s English-language films
1930s British films